John II, lord of Chalon-Arlay (1312 – 25 February 1362) was a member of the House of Chalon-Arlay.  He succeeded his father Hugh I lord of Arlay to this title, and was himself succeeded by his son, Hugh II lord of Arlay.

Life
His mother Béatrice de La Tour-du-Pin (1275–1347) was the daughter of the comte Humbert I.  Before 1332 he married Marguerite of Mello (House of Mello, daughter of the lord of Château-Chinon and of Sainte-Hermine Dreux IV of Mello, and of Eleanor of Savoy, daughter of the Duke of Aosta and Count of Savoy Amadeus V).  With Marguerite he had the following children
 John of Chalon (died 1360) Seigneur d'Auberive
 Hugh II lord of Arlay (1334–1388) Seigneur d'Arlay, in 1363 married Blanche, Dame de Frontenay
 Louis I of Chalon-Arlay (died 1366) Seigneur d'Arguel, married Marguerite of Vienne in 1363 (daughter of the Seigneur de Pymont Philippe de Vienne)
 Marguerite of Châlon (1338–1392), married c.1356 to comte Etienne de Montbéliard and Seigneur de Montfaucon.

In 1361, he remarried to Marie of Geneva, daughter of Amadeus III, Count of Geneva.

1312 births
1362 deaths
Lords of France
Chalon-Arlay